The Taiwan Confederation of Trade Unions (TCTU) is a national trade union center in Taiwan. It was established in 1997, but did not receive official recognition from the government until May 1, 2000.

Affiliates
The TCTU has 21 affiliated unions.
 Kaohsiung County Federation of Trade Unions
 Kaohsiung City Confederation of Trade Unions
 Tainan Hsien (County) Federation of Trade Unions
 YiLan County Confederation of Trade Unions
 Miaoli County Confederation of Trade Unions
 Hsinchu Confederation of Trade Unions (County level)
 Confederation of Taipei Trade Unions
 Taichung City Amalgamated Industrial Union
 Chang Hwa Confederation of Trade Unions
 Ta-ton Corporation Union
 Taiwan Power Labor Union
 Taiwan Petroleum Workers’ Union
 Taiwan Tobacco & Liquor Corporation Federation Union
 Chungwha Telecommunication Workers' Union
 China Airlines Employee Union

External links
 TCTU official site.

1997 establishments in Taiwan
Trade unions established in 1997
Trade unions in Taiwan
National federations of trade unions